The Sensational Charley Pride is the sixth studio album by the American country music artist of the same name. It was released on the RCA Victor label (catalog no. LSP-4153). The album was awarded four-and-a-half stars from the web site AllMusic. It debuted on Billboard magazine's country album chart on June 14, 1969, peaked at No. 2, and remained on the chart for 41 weeks.

Track listing

References

1969 albums
Charley Pride albums
albums produced by Felton Jarvis
albums produced by Jack Clement
RCA Records albums